Finnish Ukrainians are Ukrainians living in Finland. Their numbers vary depending on the definition.  

There is a Finnish-Ukrainian organization in Finland created in 1997.

History 
Since June 1918 about 60 Ukrainians lived in Finland. However the amount of Ukrainians in Finland for almost 70 years was unknown until 1992. Before the Russian invasion of Ukraine, many Ukrainians came to work in Finland as berry pickers during the summer. In 2016 over 9,000 Ukrainian berry pickers arrived in Finland. Their average earnings during 2015 was 666 euros.

The number of Ukrainian refugees has greatly increased since the 2022 Russian invasion of Ukraine. By July 2022 nearly 7,000 school-aged Ukrainian refugees have arrived in Finland. Schools in Finland have prepared for the start of the school year in Autumn by increasing study groups and hiring more teachers. Ministry of the Interior estimated that up to 40,000-80,000 Ukrainian refugees may arrive in Finland during 2022. 

From 2015 to July 2022 a total of 122,000 Ukrainians have submitted applications to the Finnish Immigration Service, 43,500 during 2022. Of those 43,500, nearly 36,000 sought international protection. 95% of them received a positive decision, with the rest of them being expired decisions.

Demographics

In absolute numbers Uusimaa and Finland Proper are home to most Ukrainians, though proportionally Ostrobothnia has the most Ukrainians. Ukrainian is the third most spoken foreign-language in Southern Ostrobothnia. During 2020, the number of Ukrainian speakers grew by 1,317, making it the fifth fastest growing language after Russian, English, Arabic and Persian. 52.2% of Ukrainian speakers are men. 16.2% are aged 0-14, 82.3% 15-64 and 1.5% are over the age of 65. 

In 2019, the most common occupation for Ukrainians was farming and livestock raisers, with 28% of employed Ukrainians being in this sector. In 2019, 147 babies were born to Ukrainian mothers, the birth rate being 56.7 per 1,000 Ukrainian women. For Finnish women the number was 14.9.

Website of the Society "Ukrainians of Finland"

See also 
 Finland–Ukraine relations

Notes

References 

 
Finland